Annasaheb Dange College of Engineering & Technology (ADCET) is an engineering education institute in the city of Ashta in the Indian state of Maharashtra. It is located about 20 km from Sangli. The ADCET campus is situated on nearly 32 acres of land. The college was established in 1999 by Annasaheb Dange. The institute is NAAC-accredited and NBA-accredited. The institute was once affiliated with Shivaji University, Kolhapur, but as of academic year 2017–2018, it gained autonomous status.

Curriculum

Bachelor of Technology (BTech)
 Aeronautical Engineering intake of 60
 Mechanical Engineering intake of 180
 Computer Science and Engineering intake of 120
Food Technology intake of 60
 Electrical Engineering intake of 60
 Civil Engineering intake of 60
 Automobile Engineering intake of 60

Master of Technology (MTech)
 Civil Engineering (Structural)
 Electrical Engineering

References

External links 
 
 List of educational institutions in Sangli

Engineering colleges in Maharashtra
Shivaji University
Education in Sangli district
Educational institutions established in 1999
1999 establishments in Maharashtra